A hexamine fuel tablet (or heat tablet, Esbit) is a form of solid fuel in tablet form. The tablets burn smokelessly, have a high energy density, do not liquefy while burning and leave no ashes. Invented in Murrhardt, Germany, in 1936, the main component is hexamine, which was discovered by Aleksandr Butlerov in 1859. Some fuel tablets use 1,3,5-trioxane as another ingredient.

Esbit is a genericized trademark that people often use to refer to similar products made by other companies. In most countries from the former Soviet bloc, fuel tablets are called dry alcohol.

Uses 

The tablets are used for cooking by campers, the military and relief organizations. They are often used with disposable metal stoves that are included with field ration packs. An Esbit beverage-can stove can be made by cutting off the bottom of an aluminium soft drink can, and turning it upside down to support the fuel tablet. A pot can be supported above this with a circle of chicken wire or metal tent pegs.  The burning tablets are sensitive to wind, so a simple windscreen should be used, such as a strip of aluminium foil curved in a circle around the pot and stove.  If necessary, the fuel tablet can be placed on a rock or on the soil, with a pot supported above it by rocks, but this is less than ideal.

Another common use is to provide a relatively safe (see disadvantages below) heat source for model steam engines, such as those manufactured by Wilesco and Mamod, and other external combustion engines such as Stirling engines and pop pop boats.

Advantages and disadvantages 
Hexamine is prepared by the reaction of formaldehyde and ammonia. In an acidic environment hexamine is converted to toxic formaldehyde, where the main hazard for toxicity is by ingestion.

Fuel tablets are simple, ultra-lightweight, and more compact than other fuel systems; the entire stove system and fuel can be stored inside a 0.5 litre (one pint) cooking pot. As with trioxane, hexamine has an almost unlimited shelf life if stored properly, in a sealed dry container. However, the heat given off cannot be easily adjusted, so water can be boiled, but cooking requiring simmering is more difficult. Tablets are a powerful stove fuel (30.0 MJ/kg), and are sensitive to wind and dampness. Fuel tablets are expensive and are not as widely available compared to alternatives such as alcohol or petrol,  but can use very cheap stoves. 

Esbit's Safety Data Sheet states combustion can create formaldehyde, ammonia, nitrogen oxide, hydrogen cyanide and ingestion may cause nausea, vomiting, gastrointestinal disturbances, and kidney damage.  When burned, the chemical oxidation of the fuel yields noxious fumes, which requires cooking foods in a container, such as a pot or pan, with a tight fitting lid.  Burned tablets leave a sticky dark residue on the bottom of pots. If tablets are stored or used under damp conditions they can break up while burning and shed burning fragments, though this claim is hard to verify or reproduce.

Hexamine is a precursor for the simplest synthesis of the chemical explosive RDX; in many areas its availability is tightly regulated due to this.

See also 
 Metaldehyde
 Sterno
 Firelighter

References

External links 
 Esbit Compagnie GmbH website

Fuels
Camping equipment
Solid fuels